Yuraku was the first philatelic magazine published in Japan. The first edition was issued in Tokyo on 16 July 1914 under the editorship of Meguro Kimura. It was the organ of The Yurakukai (Philatelic Society of Japan). It continued until at least Volume 9, 1922.

References

External links
 WorldCat record

1914 establishments in Japan
1922 disestablishments in Japan
Defunct magazines published in Japan
Hobby magazines
Magazines established in 1914
Magazines disestablished in 1922
Magazines published in Tokyo
Philatelic periodicals